, known simply as , was a vocalist of the Japanese band High and Mighty Color. He was the last member and the first vocalist to join the band before they were known as High and Mighty Color. He was born on January 25, 1985. He is known mainly for the screaming vocals in most of the band's songs. Yuusuke credits Metallica as one of his major musical influences.

Yuusuke has now become SUN OF A STARVE's featuring vocal. They have released one EP entitled STARVE.

Singles

Collaborations
[Tama] – Honnou (feat. Yuusuke from [High and Mighty Color])

References

1985 births
Living people
Japanese heavy metal singers
Japanese male rock singers
Musicians from Okinawa Prefecture
21st-century Japanese singers
21st-century Japanese male singers
High and Mighty Color